The 2012 United States House of Representatives elections were held November 6, 2012, to elect representatives from all 435 congressional districts across each of the 50 U.S. states. The six non-voting delegates from the District of Columbia and the inhabited U.S. territories will also be elected. Numerous federal, state, and local elections, including the 2012 presidential election and the 2012 Senate elections, were also held on this date.

Election ratings 
Several sites and individuals publish ratings of competitive seats. The seats listed below were considered competitive (not "safe" or "solid") by at least one of the rating groups. These ratings are based upon factors such as the strength of the incumbent (if the incumbent is running for re-election), the strength of the candidates, and the partisan history of the district (the Cook Partisan Voting Index is one example of this metric). Each rating describes the likelihood of a given outcome in the election.

Most election ratings use:
 Tossup: no advantage
 Tilt (sometimes used): slight advantage
 Lean: clear advantage
 Likely: strong, but not certain advantage
 Safe: outcome is nearly certain

Key:
 Incumbents not running for re-election have parentheses around their name;
 "(Open)" means that the seat was created in a state that gained one or more seats as the result of the 2010 census;
 Where two incumbents are shown, that is also because of redistricting.

<div style="overflow-x:auto;>
{| class="wikitable sortable" style="text-align:center"
|- valign=bottom
! District
! Incumbent
! Cook
! Rothenberg
! Roll Call
! Crystal Ball
! NY Times
! Real ClearPolitics
! The Hill
! Winner
! Result
|-
! 
|  | (Open)
| style="background:#fff" | 
| style="background:#fff" | 
| style="background:#fff" | 
| style="background:#fcc" | 
| style="background:#fff" | 
| style="background:#fff" | 
| style="background:#fff" | 
| style="background:#88f" | Ann Kirkpatrick (D)
|  | D gain
|-
! 
|  | Ron Barber (D)
| style="background:#ccf" | 
| style="background:#eef" | 
| style="background:#ccf" | 
| style="background:#aaf" | 
| style="background:#fff" | 
| style="background:#ccf" | 
| style="background:#ccf" | 
| style="background:#88f" | Ron Barber (D)
|  | D hold
|-
! 
|  | (Open)
| style="background:#ccf" | 
| style="background:#eef" | 
| style="background:#fff" | 
| style="background:#ccf" | 
| style="background:#ccf" | 
| style="background:#ccf" | 
| style="background:#fff" | 
| style="background:#88f" | Kyrsten Sinema (D)
|  | D gain
|-
! 
|  | Rick Crawford (R)
| style="background:#f88" | 
| style="background:#f88" | 
| style="background:#f88" | 
| style="background:#f88" | 
| style="background:#f88" | 
| style="background:#f88" | 
| style="background:#faa" | 
| style="background:#f88" | Rick Crawford (R)
|  | R hold
|-
! 
|  | (Mike Ross) (D)
| style="background:#faa" | 
| style="background:#f88" | 
| style="background:#f88" | 
| style="background:#f88" | 
| style="background:#f88" | 
| style="background:#f88" | 
| style="background:#faa" | 
| style="background:#f88" | Tom Cotton (R)
|  | R gain
|-
! 
|  | John Garamendi (D)
| style="background:#aaf" | 
| style="background:#88f" | 
| style="background:#aaf" | 
| style="background:#88f" | 
| style="background:#ccf" | 
| style="background:#aaf" | 
| style="background:#ccf" | 
| style="background:#88f" | John Garamendi (D)
|  | D hold
|-
! 
|  | Dan Lungren (R)
| style="background:#fff" | 
| style="background:#fff" | 
| style="background:#fff" | 
| style="background:#ccf" | 
| style="background:#fff" | 
| style="background:#fff" | 
| style="background:#fff" | 
| style="background:#88f" | Ami Bera (D)
|  | D gain
|-
! 
|  | Jerry McNerney (D)
| style="background:#fff" | 
| style="background:#eef" | 
| style="background:#fff" | 
| style="background:#ccf" | 
| style="background:#ccf" | 
| style="background:#fff" | 
| style="background:#ccf" | 
| style="background:#88f" | Jerry McNerney (D)
|  | D hold
|-
! 
|  | Jeff Denham (R)
| style="background:#fff" | 
| style="background:#fee" | 
| style="background:#fff" | 
| style="background:#fcc" | 
| style="background:#fcc" | 
| style="background:#fff" | 
| style="background:#fff" | 
| style="background:#f88" | Jeff Denham (R)
|  | R hold
|-
! 
|  | Jim Costa (D)
| style="background:#88f" | 
| style="background:#88f" | 
| style="background:#88f" | 
| style="background:#88f" | 
| style="background:#ccf" | 
| style="background:#88f" | 
| style="background:#aaf" | 
| style="background:#88f" | Jim Costa (D)
|  | D hold
|-
! 
|  | (Open)
| style="background:#faa" | 
| style="background:#f88" | 
| style="background:#f88" | 
| style="background:#faa" | 
| style="background:#fcc" | 
| style="background:#faa" | 
| style="background:#fcc" | 
| style="background:#f88" | David G. Valadao (R)
|  | R gain
|-
! 
|  | Lois Capps (D)
| style="background:#ccf" | 
| style="background:#eef" | 
| style="background:#fff" | 
| style="background:#ccf" | 
| style="background:#ccf" | 
| style="background:#fff" | 
| style="background:#fff" | 
| style="background:#88f" | Lois Capps (D)
|  | D hold
|-
! 
|  | (Elton Gallegly) (R)
| style="background:#fff" | 
| style="background:#fff" | 
| style="background:#fff" | 
| style="background:#ccf" | 
| style="background:#ccf" | 
| style="background:#fff" | 
| style="background:#fff" | 
| style="background:#88f" | Julia Brownley (D)
|  | D gain
|-
! 
|  | Mary Bono Mack (R)
| style="background:#fff" | 
| style="background:#fee" | 
| style="background:#fff" | 
| style="background:#fcc" | 
| style="background:#fcc" | 
| style="background:#fff" | 
| style="background:#fff" | 
| style="background:#88f" | Raul Ruiz (D)
|  | D gain
|-
! 
|  | (Open)
| style="background:#ccf" | 
| style="background:#ccf" | 
| style="background:#ccf" | 
| style="background:#ccf" | 
| style="background:#fff" | 
| style="background:#ccf" | 
| style="background:#ccf" | 
| style="background:#88f" | Mark A. Takano (D)
|  | D gain
|-
! 
|  | (Open)
| style="background:#aaf" | 
| style="background:#aaf" | 
| style="background:#88f" | 
| style="background:#aaf" | 
| style="background:#ccf" | 
| style="background:#aaf" | 
| style="background:#aaf" | 
| style="background:#88f" | Alan S. Lowenthal (D)
|  | D gain
|-
! 
|  | Brian P. Bilbray (R)
| style="background:#fff" | 
| style="background:#fff" | 
| style="background:#fff" | 
| style="background:#ccf" | 
| style="background:#fff" | 
| style="background:#fff" | 
| style="background:#fff" | 
| style="background:#88f" | Scott Peters (D)
|  | D gain
|-
! 
|  | Scott R. Tipton (R)
| style="background:#fcc" | 
| style="background:#faa" | 
| style="background:#fff" | 
| style="background:#faa" | 
| style="background:#fcc" | 
| style="background:#fcc" | 
| style="background:#fcc" | 
| style="background:#f88" | Scott R. Tipton (R)
|  | R hold
|-
! 
|  | Mike Coffman (R)
| style="background:#fff" | 
| style="background:#fee" | 
| style="background:#fff" | 
| style="background:#fcc" | 
| style="background:#fcc" | 
| style="background:#fff" | 
| style="background:#fff" | 
| style="background:#f88" | Mike Coffman (R)
|  | R hold
|-
! 
|  | Ed Perlmutter (D)
| style="background:#ccf" | 
| style="background:#ccf" | 
| style="background:#aaf" | 
| style="background:#aaf" | 
| style="background:#88f" | 
| style="background:#ccf" | 
| style="background:#88f" | 
| style="background:#88f" | Ed Perlmutter (D)
|  | D hold
|-
! 
|  | Jim Himes (D)
| style="background:#88f" | 
| style="background:#88f" | 
| style="background:#88f" | 
| style="background:#88f" | 
| style="background:#88f" | 
| style="background:#aaf" | 
| style="background:#88f" | 
| style="background:#88f" | Jim Himes (D)
|  | D hold
|-
! 
|  | (Chris Murphy) (D)
| style="background:#fff" | 
| style="background:#fff" | 
| style="background:#ccf" | 
| style="background:#ccf" | 
| style="background:#fff" | 
| style="background:#fff" | 
| style="background:#ccf" | 
| style="background:#88f" | Elizabeth Esty (D)
|  | D hold
|-
! 
|  | Steve Southerland (R)
| style="background:#fcc" | 
| style="background:#faa" | 
| style="background:#fcc" | 
| style="background:#fcc" | 
| style="background:#fcc" | 
| style="background:#fcc" | 
| style="background:#faa" | 
| style="background:#f88" | Steve Southerland (R)
|  | R hold
|-
! 
|  | (Open)
| style="background:#aaf" | 
| style="background:#88f" | 
| style="background:#88f" | 
| style="background:#88f" | 
| style="background:#ccf" | 
| style="background:#aaf" | 
| style="background:#aaf" | 
| style="background:#88f" | Alan Grayson (D)
|  | D gain
|-
! 
|  | Daniel Webster (R)
| style="background:#fcc" | 
| style="background:#fcc" | 
| style="background:#fcc" | 
| style="background:#fcc" | 
| style="background:#fcc" | 
| style="background:#fcc" | 
| style="background:#fff" | 
| style="background:#f88" | Daniel Webster (R)
|  | R hold
|-
! 
|  | Bill Young (R)
| style="background:#f88" | 
| style="background:#f88" | 
| style="background:#f88" | 
| style="background:#f88" | 
| style="background:#f88" | 
| style="background:#faa" | 
| style="background:#fcc" | 
| style="background:#f88" | Bill Young (R)
|  | R hold
|-
! 
|  | Vern Buchanan (R)
| style="background:#faa" | 
| style="background:#faa" | 
| style="background:#faa" | 
| style="background:#faa" | 
| style="background:#fcc" | 
| style="background:#faa" | 
| style="background:#faa" | 
| style="background:#f88" | Vern Buchanan (R)
|  | R hold
|-
! 
|  | Allen West (R)
| style="background:#fff" | 
| style="background:#fee" | 
| style="background:#fcc" | 
| style="background:#fcc" | 
| style="background:#fff" | 
| style="background:#fff" | 
| style="background:#fff" | 
| style="background:#88f" | Patrick Murphy (D)
|  | D gain
|-
! 
|  | (Open)
| style="background:#aaf" | 
| style="background:#aaf" | 
| style="background:#aaf" | 
| style="background:#ccf" | 
| style="background:#ccf" | 
| style="background:#ccf" | 
| style="background:#fff" | 
| style="background:#88f" | Lois Frankel (D)
|  | D gain
|-
! 
|  | David Rivera (R)
| style="background:#ccf" | 
| style="background:#ccf" | 
| style="background:#ccf" | 
| style="background:#ccf" | 
| style="background:#fff" | 
| style="background:#ccf" | 
| style="background:#aaf" | 
| style="background:#88f" | Joe Garcia (D)
|  | D gain
|-
! 
|  | John Barrow (D)
| style="background:#fff" | 
| style="background:#eef" | 
| style="background:#fff" | 
| style="background:#ccf" | 
| style="background:#fff" | 
| style="background:#fff" | 
| style="background:#fff" | 
| style="background:#88f" | John Barrow (D)
|  | D hold
|-
! 
|  | Joe Walsh (R)
| style="background:#aaf" | 
| style="background:#aaf" | 
| style="background:#ccf" | 
| style="background:#ccf" | 
| style="background:#ccf" | 
| style="background:#aaf" | 
| style="background:#aaf" | 
| style="background:#88f" | Tammy Duckworth (D)
|  | D gain
|-
! 
|  | Bob Dold (R)
| style="background:#fff" | 
| style="background:#fff" | 
| style="background:#fff" | 
| style="background:#fcc" | 
| style="background:#ccf" | 
| style="background:#fff" | 
| style="background:#fff" | 
| style="background:#88f" | Brad Schneider (D)
|  | D gain
|-
! 
|  | Judy Biggert (R)
| style="background:#fff" | 
| style="background:#fff" | 
| style="background:#fff" | 
| style="background:#ccf" | 
| style="background:#ccf" | 
| style="background:#ccf" | 
| style="background:#ccf" | 
| style="background:#88f" | Bill Foster (D)
|  | D gain
|-
! 
|  | (Jerry F. Costello) (D)
| style="background:#fff" | 
| style="background:#fff" | 
| style="background:#fff" | 
| style="background:#ccf" | 
| style="background:#fff" | 
| style="background:#fff" | 
| style="background:#fff" | 
| style="background:#88f" | Bill Enyart (D)
|  | D hold
|-
! 
|  | (Tim Johnson) (R)
| style="background:#fff" | 
| style="background:#fff" | 
| style="background:#fff" | 
| style="background:#ccf" | 
| style="background:#fcc" | 
| style="background:#fff" | 
| style="background:#fff" | 
| style="background:#f88" | Rodney L. Davis (R)
|  | R hold
|-
! 
|  | Bobby Schilling (R)
| style="background:#fff" | 
| style="background:#fff" | 
| style="background:#fff" | 
| style="background:#ccf" | 
| style="background:#ccf" | 
| style="background:#fff" | 
| style="background:#ccf" | 
| style="background:#88f" | Cheri Bustos (D)
|  | D gain
|-
! 
|  | (Joe Donnelly) (D)
| style="background:#faa" | 
| style="background:#f88" | 
| style="background:#faa" | 
| style="background:#faa" | 
| style="background:#88f" | 
| style="background:#faa" | 
| style="background:#fcc" | 
| style="background:#f88" | Jackie Walorski (R)
|  | R gain
|-
! 
|  | Larry Bucshon (R)
| style="background:#fcc" | 
| style="background:#faa" | 
| style="background:#f88" | 
| style="background:#fcc" | 
| style="background:#fcc" | 
| style="background:#faa" | 
| style="background:#fcc" | 
| style="background:#f88" | Larry Bucshon (R)
|  | R hold
|-
! 
|  | Bruce Braley (D)
| style="background:#aaf" | 
| style="background:#88f" | 
| style="background:#88f" | 
| style="background:#aaf" | 
| style="background:#88f" | 
| style="background:#aaf" | 
| style="background:#aaf" | 
| style="background:#88f" | Bruce Braley (D)
|  | D hold
|-
! 
|  | David Loebsack (D)
| style="background:#aaf" | 
| style="background:#aaf" | 
| style="background:#aaf" | 
| style="background:#aaf" | 
| style="background:#88f" | 
| style="background:#aaf" | 
| style="background:#ccf" | 
| style="background:#88f" | David Loebsack (D)
|  | D hold
|-
! 
|  | Leonard Boswell (D) /Tom Latham (R)
| style="background:#fcc" | 
| style="background:#fee" | 
| style="background:#fff" | 
| style="background:#fcc" | 
| style="background:#fff" | 
| style="background:#fff" | 
| style="background:#fff" | 
| style="background:#f88" | Tom Latham (R)
|  | D Loss
|-
! 
|  | Steve King (R)
| style="background:#fcc" | 
| style="background:#fee" | 
| style="background:#fcc" | 
| style="background:#fcc" | 
| style="background:#fcc" | 
| style="background:#fff" | 
| style="background:#fcc" | 
| style="background:#f88" | Steve King (R)
|  | R hold
|-
! 
|  | Ben Chandler (D)
| style="background:#fff" | 
| style="background:#fff" | 
| style="background:#fff" | 
| style="background:#fcc" | 
| style="background:#ccf" | 
| style="background:#fff" | 
| style="background:#fff" | 
| style="background:#f88" | Andy Barr (R)
|  | R gain
|-
! 
|  | Michael Michaud (D)
| style="background:#88f" | 
| style="background:#88f" | 
| style="background:#88f" | 
| style="background:#88f" | 
| style="background:#88f" | 
| style="background:#ccf" | 
| style="background:#aaf" | 
| style="background:#88f" | Michael Michaud (D)
|  | D hold
|-
! 
|  | Roscoe G. Bartlett (R)
| style="background:#aaf" | 
| style="background:#aaf" | 
| style="background:#aaf" | 
| style="background:#aaf" | 
| style="background:#ccf" | 
| style="background:#aaf" | 
| style="background:#ccf" | 
| style="background:#88f" | John K. Delaney (D)
|  | D gain
|-
! 
|  | John F. Tierney (D)
| style="background:#fcc" | 
| style="background:#fcc" | 
| style="background:#fcc" | 
| style="background:#fcc" | 
| style="background:#fff" | 
| style="background:#fcc" | 
| style="background:#fcc" | 
| style="background:#88f" | John F. Tierney (D)
|  | D hold
|-
! 
|  | Dan Benishek (R)
| style="background:#fff" | 
| style="background:#fff" | 
| style="background:#fff" | 
| style="background:#ccf" | 
| style="background:#fff" | 
| style="background:#fff" | 
| style="background:#fff" | 
| style="background:#f88" | Dan Benishek (R)
|  | R hold
|-
! 
|  | Justin Amash (R)
| style="background:#faa" | 
| style="background:#f88" | 
| style="background:#faa" | 
| style="background:#fcc" | 
| style="background:#fcc" | 
| style="background:#faa" | 
| style="background:#f88" | 
| style="background:#f88" | Justin Amash (R)
|  | R hold
|-
! 
|  | Fred Upton (R)
| style="background:#f88" | 
| style="background:#f88" | 
| style="background:#f88" | 
| style="background:#f88" | 
| style="background:#f88" | 
| style="background:#f88" | 
| style="background:#faa" | 
| style="background:#f88" | Fred Upton (R)
|  | R hold
|-
! 
|  | Tim Walberg (R)
| style="background:#f88" | 
| style="background:#f88" | 
| style="background:#f88" | 
| style="background:#f88" | 
| style="background:#fcc" | 
| style="background:#f88" | 
| style="background:#f88" | 
| style="background:#f88" | Tim Walberg (R)
|  | R hold
|-
! 
|  | (Thaddeus G. McCotter) (R)
| style="background:#fcc" | 
| style="background:#fcc" | 
| style="background:#faa" | 
| style="background:#fcc" | 
| style="background:#fcc" | 
| style="background:#fff" | 
| style="background:#faa" | 
| style="background:#f88" | Kerry Bentivolio (R)
|  | R hold
|-
! 
|  | John Kline (R)
| style="background:#f88" | 
| style="background:#f88" | 
| style="background:#faa" | 
| style="background:#faa" | 
| style="background:#fcc" | 
| style="background:#f88" | 
| style="background:#faa" | 
| style="background:#f88" | John Kline (R)
|  | R hold
|-
! 
|  | Michele Bachmann (R)
| style="background:#fcc" | 
| style="background:#fcc" | 
| style="background:#fcc" | 
| style="background:#faa" | 
| style="background:#f88" | 
| style="background:#fcc" | 
| style="background:#fcc" | 
| style="background:#f88" | Michele Bachmann (R)
|  | R hold
|-
! 
|  | Collin C. Peterson (D)
| style="background:#88f" | 
| style="background:#88f" | 
| style="background:#88f" | 
| style="background:#88f" | 
| style="background:#88f" | 
| style="background:#88f" | 
| style="background:#aaf" | 
| style="background:#88f" | Collin C. Peterson (D)
|  | D hold
|-
! 
|  | Chip Cravaack (R)
| style="background:#fff" | 
| style="background:#fff" | 
| style="background:#fff" | 
| style="background:#ccf" | 
| style="background:#fff" | 
| style="background:#fff" | 
| style="background:#fff" | 
| style="background:#88f" | Rick Nolan (D)
|  | D gain
|-
! 
|  | (Denny Rehberg) (R)
| style="background:#faa" | 
| style="background:#f88" | 
| style="background:#faa" | 
| style="background:#faa" | 
| style="background:#f88" | 
| style="background:#faa" | 
| style="background:#faa" | 
| style="background:#f88" | Steve Daines (R)
|  | R hold
|-
! 
|  | Lee Terry (R)
| style="background:#faa" | 
| style="background:#f88" | 
| style="background:#f88" | 
| style="background:#f88" | 
| style="background:#f88" | 
| style="background:#fcc" | 
| style="background:#faa" | 
| style="background:#f88" | Lee Terry (R)
|  | R hold
|-
! 
|  | Joe Heck (R)
| style="background:#fcc" | 
| style="background:#fcc" | 
| style="background:#fcc" | 
| style="background:#fcc" | 
| style="background:#fcc" | 
| style="background:#fcc" | 
| style="background:#fff" | 
| style="background:#f88" | Joe Heck (R)
|  | R hold
|-
! 
|  | (Open)
| style="background:#fff" | 
| style="background:#fff" | 
| style="background:#fff" | 
| style="background:#ccf" | 
| style="background:#ccf" | 
| style="background:#fff" | 
| style="background:#fff" | 
| style="background:#88f" | Steven Horsford (D)
|  | D gain
|-
! 
|  | Frank Guinta (R)
| style="background:#fff" | 
| style="background:#fff" | 
| style="background:#fff" | 
| style="background:#fcc" | 
| style="background:#fcc" | 
| style="background:#fff" | 
| style="background:#fff" | 
| style="background:#88f" | Carol Shea-Porter (D)
|  | D gain
|-
! 
|  | Charlie Bass (R)
| style="background:#ccf" | 
| style="background:#fff" | 
| style="background:#fff" | 
| style="background:#ccf" | 
| style="background:#fff" | 
| style="background:#ccf" | 
| style="background:#ccf" | 
| style="background:#88f" | Ann McLane Kuster (D)
|  | D gain
|-
! 
|  | Jon Runyan (R)
| style="background:#fcc" | 
| style="background:#faa" | 
| style="background:#f88" | 
| style="background:#faa" | 
| style="background:#fcc" | 
| style="background:#fcc" | 
| style="background:#faa" | 
| style="background:#f88" | Jon Runyan (R)
|  | R hold
|-
! 
|  | Scott Garrett (R)
| style="background:#f88" | 
| style="background:#f88" | 
| style="background:#f88" | 
| style="background:#f88" | 
| style="background:#f88" | 
| style="background:#f88" | 
| style="background:#faa" | 
| style="background:#f88" | Scott Garrett (R)
|  | R hold
|-
! 
|  | Leonard Lance (R)
| style="background:#f88" | 
| style="background:#f88" | 
| style="background:#f88" | 
| style="background:#f88" | 
| style="background:#f88" | 
| style="background:#faa" | 
| style="background:#f88" | 
| style="background:#f88" | Leonard Lance (R)
|  | R hold
|-
! 
|  | Bill Pascrell (D)
| style="background:#88f" | 
| style="background:#88f" | 
| style="background:#88f" | 
| style="background:#88f" | 
| style="background:#88f" | 
| style="background:#88f" | 
| style="background:#aaf" | 
| style="background:#88f" | Bill Pascrell (D)
|  | D hold
|-
! 
|  | (Martin Heinrich) (D)
| style="background:#88f" | 
| style="background:#88f" | 
| style="background:#88f" | 
| style="background:#88f" | 
| style="background:#ccf" | 
| style="background:#88f" | 
| style="background:#aaf" | 
| style="background:#88f" | Michelle Lujan Grisham (D)
|  | D hold
|-
! 
|  | Timothy H. Bishop (D)
| style="background:#ccf" | 
| style="background:#eef" | 
| style="background:#ccf" | 
| style="background:#ccf" | 
| style="background:#fff" | 
| style="background:#fff" | 
| style="background:#fff" | 
| style="background:#88f" | Timothy H. Bishop (D)
|  | D hold
|-
! 
|  | Michael G. Grimm (R)
| style="background:#faa" | 
| style="background:#fcc" | 
| style="background:#faa" | 
| style="background:#faa" | 
| style="background:#fff" | 
| style="background:#faa" | 
| style="background:#faa" | 
| style="background:#f88" | Michael G. Grimm (R)
|  | R hold
|-
! 
|  | Nan Hayworth (R)
| style="background:#fff" | 
| style="background:#fee" | 
| style="background:#fff" | 
| style="background:#fcc" | 
| style="background:#fcc" | 
| style="background:#fcc" | 
| style="background:#fff" | 
| style="background:#88f" | Sean Patrick Maloney (D)
|  | D gain
|-
! 
|  | Christopher Gibson (R)
| style="background:#fff" | 
| style="background:#fee" | 
| style="background:#fff" | 
| style="background:#fcc" | 
| style="background:#fcc" | 
| style="background:#fcc" | 
| style="background:#fff" | 
| style="background:#f88" | Christopher Gibson (R)
|  | R hold
|-
! 
|  | Bill Owens (D)
| style="background:#ccf" | 
| style="background:#eef" | 
| style="background:#fff" | 
| style="background:#ccf" | 
| style="background:#ccf" | 
| style="background:#fff" | 
| style="background:#ccf" | 
| style="background:#88f" | Bill Owens (D)
|  | D hold
|-
! 
|  | Richard L. Hanna (R)
| style="background:#f88" | 
| style="background:#f88" | 
| style="background:#f88" | 
| style="background:#f88" | 
| style="background:#fcc" | 
| style="background:#f88" | 
| style="background:#faa" | 
| style="background:#f88" | Richard L. Hanna (R)
|  | R hold
|-
! 
|  | Tom Reed (R)
| style="background:#f88" | 
| style="background:#f88" | 
| style="background:#f88" | 
| style="background:#f88" | 
| style="background:#fcc" | 
| style="background:#f88" | 
| style="background:#f88" | 
| style="background:#f88" | Tom Reed (R)
|  | R hold
|-
! 
|  | Ann Marie Buerkle (R)
| style="background:#ccf" | 
| style="background:#eef" | 
| style="background:#fff" | 
| style="background:#ccf" | 
| style="background:#fff" | 
| style="background:#ccf" | 
| style="background:#fff" | 
| style="background:#88f" | Dan Maffei (D)
|  | D gain
|-
! 
|  | Louise M. Slaughter (D)
| style="background:#aaf" | 
| style="background:#aaf" | 
| style="background:#aaf" | 
| style="background:#ccf" | 
| style="background:#ccf" | 
| style="background:#ccf" | 
| style="background:#aaf" | 
| style="background:#88f" | Louise M. Slaughter (D)
|  | D hold
|-
! 
|  | Kathy Hochul (D)
| style="background:#fcc" | 
| style="background:#fee" | 
| style="background:#fff" | 
| style="background:#fcc" | 
| style="background:#fff" | 
| style="background:#fff" | 
| style="background:#fff" | 
| style="background:#f88" | Chris Collins (R)
|  | R gain
|-
! 
|  | Mike McIntyre (D)
| style="background:#fff" | 
| style="background:#fff" | 
| style="background:#fff" | 
| style="background:#ccf" | 
| style="background:#ccf" | 
| style="background:#fff" | 
| style="background:#fff" | 
| style="background:#88f" | Mike McIntyre (D)
|  | D hold
|-
! 
|  | Larry Kissell (D)
| style="background:#faa" | 
| style="background:#faa" | 
| style="background:#faa" | 
| style="background:#faa" | 
| style="background:#fff" | 
| style="background:#faa" | 
| style="background:#faa" | 
| style="background:#f88" | Richard Hudson (R)
|  | R gain
|-
! 
|  | (Heath Shuler) (D)
| style="background:#faa" | 
| style="background:#faa" | 
| style="background:#f88" | 
| style="background:#faa" | 
| style="background:#fcc" | 
| style="background:#faa" | 
| style="background:#faa" | 
| style="background:#f88" | Mark Meadows (R)
|  | R gain
|-
! 
|  | (Brad Miller) (D)
| style="background:#faa" | 
| style="background:#f88" | 
| style="background:#f88" | 
| style="background:#f88" | 
| style="background:#fcc" | 
| style="background:#f88" | 
| style="background:#faa" | 
| style="background:#f88" | George Holding (R)
|  | R gain
|-
! 
|  | (Rick Berg) (R)
| style="background:#faa" | 
| style="background:#f88" | 
| style="background:#faa" | 
| style="background:#faa" | 
| style="background:#f88" | 
| style="background:#faa" | 
| style="background:#faa" | 
| style="background:#f88" | Kevin Cramer (R)
|  | R hold
|-
! 
|  | Bill Johnson (R)
| style="background:#fff" | 
| style="background:#fcc" | 
| style="background:#fcc" | 
| style="background:#fcc" | 
| style="background:#fff" | 
| style="background:#fff" | 
| style="background:#fcc" | 
| style="background:#f88" | Bill Johnson (R)
|  | R hold
|-
! 
|  | Bob Gibbs (R)
| style="background:#faa" | 
| style="background:#f88" | 
| style="background:#f88" | 
| style="background:#f88" | 
| style="background:#fcc" | 
| style="background:#faa" | 
| style="background:#faa" | 
| style="background:#f88" | Bob Gibbs (R)
|  | R hold
|-
! 
|  | Marcy Kaptur (D)
| style="background:#88f" | 
| style="background:#88f" | 
| style="background:#88f" | 
| style="background:#88f" | 
| style="background:#88f" | 
| style="background:#88f" | 
| style="background:#aaf" | 
| style="background:#88f" | Marcy Kaptur (D)
|  | D hold
|-
! 
|  | Betty Sutton (D) /Jim Renacci (R)
| style="background:#fcc" | 
| style="background:#fee" | 
| style="background:#fcc" | 
| style="background:#ccf" | 
| style="background:#fff" | 
| style="background:#fff" | 
| style="background:#fff" | 
| style="background:#f88" | Jim Renacci (R)
|  | D Loss
|-
! 
|  | (Dan Boren) (D)
| style="background:#faa" | 
| style="background:#f88" | 
| style="background:#faa" | 
| style="background:#fcc" | 
| style="background:#f88" | 
| style="background:#faa" | 
| style="background:#fcc" | 
| style="background:#f88" | Markwayne Mullin (R)
|  | R gain
|-
! 
|  | Kurt Schrader (D)
| style="background:#88f" | 
| style="background:#88f" | 
| style="background:#88f" | 
| style="background:#88f" | 
| style="background:#ccf" | 
| style="background:#88f" | 
| style="background:#aaf" | 
| style="background:#88f" | Kurt Schrader (D)
|  | D hold
|-
! 
|  | Jim Gerlach (R)
| style="background:#faa" | 
| style="background:#f88" | 
| style="background:#f88" | 
| style="background:#faa" | 
| style="background:#fcc" | 
| style="background:#faa" | 
| style="background:#faa" | 
| style="background:#f88" | Jim Gerlach (R)
|  | R hold
|-
! 
|  | Pat Meehan (R)
| style="background:#f88" | 
| style="background:#f88" | 
| style="background:#f88" | 
| style="background:#f88" | 
| style="background:#fcc" | 
| style="background:#f88" | 
| style="background:#faa" | 
| style="background:#f88" | Pat Meehan (R)
|  | R hold
|-
! 
|  | Michael G. Fitzpatrick (R)
| style="background:#fcc" | 
| style="background:#faa" | 
| style="background:#f88" | 
| style="background:#faa" | 
| style="background:#fcc" | 
| style="background:#faa" | 
| style="background:#fcc" | 
| style="background:#f88" | Michael G. Fitzpatrick (R)
|  | R hold
|-
! 
|  | Lou Barletta (R)
| style="background:#f88" | 
| style="background:#f88" | 
| style="background:#f88" | 
| style="background:#f88" | 
| style="background:#f88" | 
| style="background:#f88" | 
| style="background:#faa" | 
| style="background:#f88" | Lou Barletta (R)
|  | R hold
|-
! 
|  | Mark Critz (D)
| style="background:#fff" | 
| style="background:#fff" | 
| style="background:#fff" | 
| style="background:#ccf" | 
| style="background:#fff" | 
| style="background:#fff" | 
| style="background:#fff" | 
| style="background:#f88" | Keith Rothfus (R)
|  | R gain
|-
! 
|  | Charlie Dent (R)
| style="background:#f88" | 
| style="background:#f88" | 
| style="background:#f88" | 
| style="background:#f88" | 
| style="background:#f88" | 
| style="background:#f88" | 
| style="background:#faa" | 
| style="background:#f88" | Charlie Dent (R)
|  | R hold
|-
! 
|  | Timothy F. Murphy (R)
| style="background:#f88" | 
| style="background:#f88" | 
| style="background:#f88" | 
| style="background:#f88" | 
| style="background:#f88" | 
| style="background:#f88" | 
| style="background:#faa" | 
| style="background:#f88" | Timothy F. Murphy (R)
|  | R hold
|-
! 
|  | David Cicilline (D)
| style="background:#fff" | 
| style="background:#eef" | 
| style="background:#fff" | 
| style="background:#ccf" | 
| style="background:#ccf" | 
| style="background:#ccf" | 
| style="background:#fff" | 
| style="background:#88f" | David Cicilline (D)
|  | D hold
|-
! 
|  | Kristi Noem (R)
| style="background:#faa" | 
| style="background:#f88" | 
| style="background:#f88" | 
| style="background:#faa" | 
| style="background:#f88" | 
| style="background:#f88" | 
| style="background:#f88" | 
| style="background:#f88" | Kristi Noem (R)
|  | R hold
|-
! 
|  | Scott DesJarlais (R)
| style="background:#fff" | 
| style="background:#fee" | 
| style="background:#fcc" | 
| style="background:#faa" | 
| style="background:#f88" | 
| style="background:#fcc" | 
| style="background:#fcc" | 
| style="background:#f88" | Scott DesJarlais (R)
|  | R hold
|-
! 
|  | Michael McCaul (R)
| style="background:#f88" | 
| style="background:#f88" | 
| style="background:#f88" | 
| style="background:#f88" | 
| style="background:#f88" | 
| style="background:#f88" | 
| style="background:#faa" | 
| style="background:#f88" | Michael McCaul (R)
|  | R hold
|-
! 
|  | (Ron Paul) (R)
| style="background:#fcc" | 
| style="background:#fcc" | 
| style="background:#fcc" | 
| style="background:#faa" | 
| style="background:#f88" | 
| style="background:#fcc" | 
| style="background:#fcc" | 
| style="background:#f88" | Randy K. Weber (R)
|  | R hold
|-
! 
|  | Francisco Canseco (R)
| style="background:#fff" | 
| style="background:#fee" | 
| style="background:#fff" | 
| style="background:#ccf" | 
| style="background:#fcc" | 
| style="background:#fff" | 
| style="background:#fff" | 
| style="background:#88f" | Pete Gallego (D)
|  | D gain
|-
! 
|  | (Open)
| style="background:#88f" | 
| style="background:#88f" | 
| style="background:#88f" | 
| style="background:#88f" | 
| style="background:#88f" | 
| style="background:#88f" | 
| style="background:#aaf" | 
| style="background:#88f" | Filemon Vela Jr. (D)
|  | D gain
|-
! 
|  | Jim Matheson (D)
| style="background:#fcc" | 
| style="background:#fee" | 
| style="background:#fcc" | 
| style="background:#fcc" | 
| style="background:#fff" | 
| style="background:#fff" | 
| style="background:#fff" | 
| style="background:#88f" | Jim Matheson (D)
|  | D hold
|-
! 
|  | E. Scott Rigell (R)
| style="background:#faa" | 
| style="background:#faa" | 
| style="background:#faa" | 
| style="background:#faa" | 
| style="background:#fcc" | 
| style="background:#faa" | 
| style="background:#fcc" | 
| style="background:#f88" | E. Scott Rigell (R)
|  | R hold
|-
! 
|  | Robert Hurt (R)
| style="background:#f88" | 
| style="background:#f88" | 
| style="background:#f88" | 
| style="background:#faa" | 
| style="background:#f88" | 
| style="background:#f88" | 
| style="background:#f88" | 
| style="background:#f88" | Robert Hurt (R)
|  | R hold
|-
! 
|  | (Open)
| style="background:#ccf" | 
| style="background:#ccf" | 
| style="background:#aaf" | 
| style="background:#aaf" | 
| style="background:#ccf" | 
| style="background:#ccf" | 
| style="background:#ccf" | 
| style="background:#88f" | Suzan DelBene (D)
|  | D gain
|-
! 
|  | Jaime Herrera Beutler (R)
| style="background:#f88" | 
| style="background:#f88" | 
| style="background:#f88" | 
| style="background:#f88" | 
| style="background:#f88" | 
| style="background:#f88" | 
| style="background:#faa" | 
| style="background:#f88" | Jaime Herrera Beutler (R)
|  | R hold
|-
! 
|  | (Open)
| style="background:#88f" | 
| style="background:#88f" | 
| style="background:#88f" | 
| style="background:#88f" | 
| style="background:#ccf" | 
| style="background:#88f" | 
| style="background:#aaf" | 
| style="background:#88f" | Denny Heck (D)
|  | D gain
|-
! 
|  | Nick Rahall (D)
| style="background:#aaf" | 
| style="background:#88f" | 
| style="background:#aaf" | 
| style="background:#aaf" | 
| style="background:#ccf" | 
| style="background:#aaf" | 
| style="background:#aaf" | 
| style="background:#88f" | Nick Rahall (D)
|  | D hold
|-
! 
|  | Sean Duffy (R)
| style="background:#fcc" | 
| style="background:#fcc" | 
| style="background:#faa" | 
| style="background:#fcc" | 
| style="background:#fcc" | 
| style="background:#fcc" | 
| style="background:#fff" | 
| style="background:#f88" | Sean Duffy (R)
|  | R hold
|-
! 
|  | Reid Ribble (R)
| style="background:#faa" | 
| style="background:#f88" | 
| style="background:#f88" | 
| style="background:#faa" | 
| style="background:#fcc" | 
| style="background:#faa" | 
| style="background:#faa" | 
| style="background:#f88" | Reid Ribble (R)
|  | R hold
|- valign=top
! District
! Incumbent
! Cook
! Rothenberg
! Roll Call
! Crystal Ball
! NY Times
! Real ClearPolitics
! The Hill
! Winner
! Result

References 

House